Julia Anita Zaetta (born) is an Australian journalist and magazine editor. She is currently editor of Better Homes and Gardens and Family Circle for Pacific Magazines, and, over the last 17 years, has been involved in the Better Homes and Gardens show on Channel Seven.

Early years
She was born in Mildura in country Victoria to Italian immigrant, Francesco "Frank" Zaetta, and the daughter of Italian immigrants, Doreen Civelli.

Education
After attending Genazzano FCJ College in Melbourne, Victoria, she studied at the University of Melbourne, gaining a Bachelor of Arts degree. Whilst at university, she worked as a book editor for Hawthorn Press. After graduation, she studied at the Comitato Linguistico in Perugia, Italy, and the New York School of Interior Design.

Career

Magazines
Her magazine career began with Australian Home Journal.
She has been editor of:
Better Homes and Gardens
Family Circle
Diabetic Living
New Woman
The Australian Women's Weekly

Awards
Under her editorship, Better Homes & Gardens has been named Australian Magazine of the Year on three occasions.
2009 – Australian Magazine Awards – Magazine of the Year and winner of the Home & Garden category
2010 – Australian Magazine Awards – runner up Magazine of the Year and winner of the Home & Garden category for the second consecutive year
2011 – Australian Newsagents Federation Awards

References

Living people
People from Mildura
Australian journalists
Australian women journalists
Australian magazine editors
Women magazine editors
Australian television presenters
Australian women television presenters
University of Melbourne alumni
Australian people of Italian descent
Year of birth missing (living people)
Writers from Victoria (Australia)
People educated at Genazzano FCJ College